Greta Hofer, née Greta Köhler, pseudonym Greta Colere (28 December 1900 – 7 May 1995) was a German opera singer.

Life 
Hofer was born in Hanover then part of the Deutsches Kaiserreich. After the First World War, from 1919 to 1923, she registered at the Hochschule für Musik, Theater und Medien Hannoversinging lessons.

She then had her first engagement in Dortmund. Since 1927, she has been performing in England with the pseudonyme Greta Colere under the conductors Thomas Beecham, Adrian Boult and Malcolm Sargent.

During the Nazi era, Köhler married the tenor Laurenz Hofer (28 April 1888 in Cologne – 29 November 1964) and moved with him to Berlin.

At the end of the Second World War, she returned with her husband to the city that was 48% destroyed by the bombing of Hanover in World War II and opened a singing studio with him, which she continued alone as a widow from 1964.

Graduates of her classes included the singers Josef Metternich, Rudolf Schock and Gotthard Kronstein.

Hofer died in Hanover at the age of 94.

Recordings 
The German National Library lists (as of April 2012) six record titles that document Greta Hofer's singing, including
 War's auch nur ein Traum. Lied aus der Operetta Monika, music: Nico Dostal, text: Hernecke, Gesang: Greta Hofer,  and his Orchestra, Clangor-Schallplatten G.m.b.H. Berlin, Schallplatten-Volksverband M 1810 (Seite 2 von 2)

Further reading  
 Hugo Thielen: Hofer, Greta. In Dirk Böttcher, Klaus Mlynek, Waldemar R. Röhrbein, Hugo Thielen: . Von den Anfängen bis in die Gegenwart. Schlütersche, Hanover 2002,  (partially available here Online).
 Hugo Thielen: Hofer, Greta. In Klaus Mlynek, Waldemar R. Röhrbein (ed.) etc: . Von den Anfängen bis in die Gegenwart. Schlütersche, Hanover 2009, .

References

External links 
 

20th-century German women  opera singers
Voice teachers
1900 births
1995 deaths
Musicians from Hanover
Hochschule für Musik, Theater und Medien Hannover alumni